The Military Order of the World War was created in 1919 at the suggestion of General of the Armies John J. Pershing as a fraternity for American military officers coming out of the Great War.  Two decades later, when the USA became involved in WWII the organization name was pluralized to its current title of Military Order of the World Wars.  Though the Order's title has not changed since 1945, it remains an officers’ society welcoming new qualified members in current military service, retired military service, or former military service and has members from the Korean War, Vietnam War, Gulf War, War in Afghanistan, War in Iraq, and peacetime service.

Membership
At its founding, the MOWW chose Major General George Herbert Harries as commander, and he served through 1925. Membership in the MOWW is open to active duty, retired and former commissioned or warrant officers of the uniformed services of the United States. This includes the US Army (USA), US Navy (USN), US Marine Corps (USMC), and the US Air Force (USAF). It also includes the US Coast Guard (USCG), United States Public Health Service (USPHS), and the National Oceanographic and Atmospheric Administration (NOAA). Additionally, any direct lineal descendant from a qualifying officer may also join the order, which indicates that the order also serves as a genealogical society.

Famous members include:

 General of the Armies John J. Pershing
 General of the Army Douglas MacArthur
 General of the Army George C. Marshall
 General William Westmoreland
 President (former army captain, WWI) Harry Truman
 President (former army captain, WWII) Ronald Reagan

Centennial Anniversary and Recent Projects 
In 2019 the Order celebrated its 100th birthday at its annual convention held in Simi Valley, California.

 Recent notable projects in 2019 included the design, purchase, and placement of a $100k Augusta-CSRA Vietnam War Veterans Memorial, in Augusta, Georgia, by the Augusta Chapter of Region V, MOWW, earning Chapter leaders a Gold Patrick Henry Award and National Citation.

Awards and Insignia

Gold Patrick Henry Award - awarded by the national chapter annually to nine (9) companions of the Order for exceptional achievement.
Silver Patrick Henry Award - awarded by local chapters to companions for superior service, lifesaving, and more.  Can also be awarded to non-companions for service to the Order.
Bronze Patrick Henry Award - awarded by local chapters to exceptional youth for patriotic achievement.
Outstanding Service Medal - awarded by local chapters for holding a key leadership role in the Order for at least three (3) years.
Outreach Service Medal - awarded by local chapters for exceptional participation in the various MOWW outreach programs (e.g. Eagle Scout recognition, Gold Award recognition, ROTC/JROTC recognition, law enforcement recognition, et cetera).
Youth Merit Medal - awarded by local chapters and individual companions to youth for achievement.
Membership Medal - worn by companions as the badge of the Order, which consists of the emblem suspended from a mini rainbow ribbon of reversed colors from the WWI Victory Medal.

Multiple awards of the decorations are denoted by military-issue mini-medal sized bronze oak leaf clusters. On the membership medal, perpetual (life) membership denoted by a silver service star.

Awards presented to other organizations
 JROTC Award of Merit: presented to the best first year, second year, and third year cadet in a JROTC battalion each class year. Multiple awards denoted by silver service stars.
 ROTC Award of Merit: presented to the best first year (bronze), second year (silver), and third year (gold) cadet in a ROTC battalion each class year. As there is a different ribbon for each ROTC program year, multiple awards to the same cadet are not possible (though a single exceptional cadet could earn the different awards).
 Eagle Scout Certificate: presented to members of the Boy Scouts of America who have earned the Eagle Scout rank.
 Summit Certificate: presented to members of the Boy Scouts of America who have earned the Venturing Summit rank.
 Quartermaster Certificate: presented to members of the Boy Scouts of America who have earned the Sea Scout Quartermaster rank.
 Gold Award Certificate: presented to members of the Girl Scouts of the USA who have earned the Gold Award.

Related organizations
 Society of the Cincinnati, for officers of the War of the Revolution and their male descendants (est. 1783).
 Aztec Club of 1847, for officers of the Mexican War and their male descendants (est. 1847).
 Military Order of the Loyal Legion of the United States, for Union officers of the Civil War and their male descendants (est. 1865).
 Military Order of the Stars and Bars, for Confederate officers of the Civil War and their male descendants (est. 1936).
 Military Order of Foreign Wars, for officers of any, foreign war and their descendants (est. 1894). (Excluded only officers of the Civil War and Indian Wars. This charter allows, for veteran officers of the Spanish War, WWI, WWII, Korean War, Vietnam War, Gulf War, War in Afghanistan, and the War in Iraq thus precluding the need, for any new combat officers order.)
 Order of the Indian Wars of the United States, for officers of the Indian Wars and their male descendants (est. 1896).
These six organizations listed above are, like the MOWW, also open to direct lineal descendants of qualifying officers of their respective war(s).  Only the MOWW does not require the officer to be a combat veteran.

References

External links

 

Fraternal orders
Lineage societies